John David Patrick Wheatley (1 January 1899 – 5 November 1967) was an English tennis player who played at Wimbledon, in the Olympics and in the Davis Cup.

Biography

Patrick Wheatley was born in Vryheid, Colony of Natal on 1 January 1899 and was educated at Bedford School.  Between 1921 and 1933, he competed at Wimbledon on eleven separate occasions, reaching the fourth round in the Men's Singles in 1924 and 1926, reaching the quarterfinals in the men's doubles in 1924, and reaching the semifinals in the mixed in 1925.

He represented Great Britain at the 1924 Summer Olympics in both the Men's Singles and the Men's Doubles. He also represented Great Britain in the Davis Cup in 1926, playing in matches against Italy and Poland.

Wheatley died in London on 5 November 1967.

References

External links
 

1899 births
1967 deaths
People educated at Bedford School
English male tennis players
Tennis players at the 1924 Summer Olympics
Olympic tennis players of Great Britain
British male tennis players
People from Natal